, commonly known as Toshiba and stylized as TOSHIBA, is a Japanese multinational conglomerate corporation headquartered in Minato, Tokyo, Japan. Its diversified products and services include power, industrial and social infrastructure systems, elevators and escalators, electronic components, semiconductors, hard disk drives (HDD), printers, batteries, lighting, as well as IT solutions such as quantum cryptography which has been in development at Cambridge Research Laboratory, Toshiba Europe, located in the United Kingdom, now being commercialised. It was one of the biggest manufacturers of personal computers, consumer electronics, home appliances, and medical equipment. As a semiconductor company and the inventor of flash memory, Toshiba had been one of the top 10 in the chip industry until its flash memory unit was spun off as Toshiba Memory, later Kioxia, in the late 2010s.

The Toshiba name is derived from its former name, Tokyo Shibaura Denki K.K. (Tokyo Shibaura Electric Co., Ltd) which in turn was a 1939 merger between Shibaura Seisaku-sho (founded in 1875) and Tokyo Denki (founded in 1890). The company name was officially changed to Toshiba Corporation in 1978. It is listed on the Tokyo Stock Exchange, where it was a constituent of the Nikkei 225 and TOPIX 100 indices (leaving both in August 2018, but returned to the latter in 2021), and the Nagoya Stock Exchange.

A technology company with a long history and sprawling businesses, Toshiba is a household name in Japan and has long been viewed as a symbol of the country's technological prowess. Its reputation has since been affected following an accounting scandal in 2015 and the bankruptcy of subsidiary energy company Westinghouse in 2017, after which it was forced to shed a number of underperforming businesses, essentially eliminating the company's century-long presence in consumer markets.

Toshiba announced on 12 November 2021 that it would split into three separate companies, respectively focusing on infrastructure, electronic devices, and all other remaining assets; the latter would retain the Toshiba name. It expected to complete the plan by March 2024. But the plan was challenged by stockholders, and at an extraordinary general meeting on 24 March 2022, they rejected the plan. They also rejected an alternative plan put forward by a large institutional investor that would have had the company search for buyers among private equity firms.

History

Tanaka Seisakusho
 was the first company established by Tanaka Hisashige (1799–1881), one of the most original and productive inventor-engineers during the Tokugawa / Edo period. Established on  July 11, 1875, it was the first Japanese company to manufacture telegraph equipment. It also manufactured switches, and miscellaneous electrical and communications equipment.
The company was inherited by Tanaka's adopted son, and later became half of the present Toshiba company. Several people who worked at Tanaka Seisakusho or who received Tanaka's guidance at a Kubusho (Ministry of Industries) factory later became pioneers themselves. These included Miyoshi Shōichi who helped Fujioka make the first power generator in Japan and to establish a company, Hakunetsusha to make bulbs; Oki Kibatarō, the founder of the present Oki Denki (Oki Electric Industry); and Ishiguro Keizaburō, a co-founder of the present Anritsu.

After the demise of the founder in 1881 Tanaka Seisakusho became partly owned by General Electric and expanded into the production of torpedoes and mines at the request of the Imperial Japanese Navy, to become one of the largest manufacturing companies of the time. However, as the Navy started to use competitive bids and then build its own works, the demand decreased substantially and the company started to lose money. The main creditor to the company, Mitsui Bank, took over the insolvent company in 1893 and renamed it Shibaura Seisakusho (Shibaura Engineering Works).

Shibaura Seisakusho
 was the new name given to Tanaka Seisakusho after it was declared insolvent in 1893 and taken over by Mitsui Bank.

In 1910, it formed a tie-up with General Electric (GE), which, in exchange for technology, acquired about a quarter of the shares of Shibaura. The relation with GE continued until the beginning of World War II and resumed in 1953 with GE's 24 percent shareholding in the successor company, Tokyo Shibaura Denki. This percentage decreased substantially since then.

Hakunetsusha (Tokyo Denki)
 was a company established by Shōichi Miyoshi and Fujioka Ichisuke, two of Japan's industrial pioneers during the Tokugawa / Edo period. It specialized in the manufacture of light bulbs.

The company was established in 1890 and started out by selling bulbs using bamboo filaments. However, following the opening up of trade with the West through the Unequal treaty, Hakunetsusha met with fierce competition from imports. Its bulb cost about 60 percent more than the imports and the quality was poorer. The company managed to survive with the booms after the First Sino-Japanese War of 1894–95 and the Russo-Japanese War of 1904–05, but afterward its financial position was precarious. 
 
In 1905 the company was renamed Tokyo Denki (Tokyo Electric) and entered into a financial and technological collaboration with General Electric of the US. General Electric acquired 51 percent share of ownership, sent a vice president, and provided the technology for bulb-making. Production equipment was bought from GE and Tokyo Denki soon started selling its products with GE's trademark.

1939 to 2000

Toshiba was founded in 1939 by the merger of Shibaura Seisakusho and Tokyo Denki. The merger of Shibaura and Tokyo Denki created a new company called Tokyo Shibaura Denki (Tokyo Shibaura Electric). It was soon nicknamed Toshiba, but it was not until 1978 that the company was officially renamed Toshiba Corporation.

The group expanded rapidly, driven by a combination of organic growth and by acquisitions, buying heavy engineering, and primary industry firms in the 1940s and 1950s. Groups created include Toshiba Music Industries/Toshiba EMI (1960), Toshiba International Corporation (the 1970s) Toshiba Electrical Equipment (1974), Toshiba Chemical (1974), Toshiba Lighting and Technology (1989), Toshiba America Information Systems (1989) and Toshiba Carrier Corporation (1999).

Toshiba is responsible for a number of Japanese firsts, including radar (1912), the TAC digital computer (1954), transistor television, color CRTs and microwave oven (1959), color video phone (1971), Japanese word processor (1978), MRI system (1982), laptop personal computer (1986), NAND EEPROM (1991), DVD (1995), the Libretto sub-notebook personal computer (1996) and HD DVD (2005).

In 1977, Toshiba acquired the Brazilian company Semp (Sociedade Eletromercantil Paulista), subsequently forming Semp Toshiba through the combination of the two companies' South American operations.

 

In 1987, Tocibai Machine, a subsidiary of Toshiba, was accused of illegally selling CNC milling machines used to produce very quiet submarine propellers to the Soviet Union in violation of the CoCom agreement, an international embargo on certain countries to COMECON countries. The Toshiba-Kongsberg scandal involved a subsidiary of Toshiba and the Norwegian company Kongsberg Vaapenfabrikk. The incident strained relations between the United States and Japan, and resulted in the arrest and prosecution of two senior executives, as well as the imposition of sanctions on the company by both countries. Senator John Heinz of Pennsylvania said "What Toshiba and Kongsberg did was ransom the security of the United States for $517 million."

2000 to 2010
In 2001, Toshiba signed a contract with Orion Electric, one of the world's largest OEM consumer video electronic makers and suppliers, to manufacture and supply finished consumer TV and video products for Toshiba to meet the increasing demand for the North American market. The contract ended in 2008, ending seven years of OEM production with Orion.

In December 2004, Toshiba quietly announced it would discontinue manufacturing traditional in-house cathode-ray tube (CRT) televisions. In 2005, Matsushita Toshiba Picture Display Co. Ltd. (a joint venture between Panasonic and Toshiba created in 2002) stopped production of CRTs at its factory in Horseheads, New York. A year later, in 2006, it stopped production at its Malaysian factory, following heavy losses. In 2006, Toshiba terminated sales of CRT TVs in Japan and production of in-house plasma TVs. To ensure its future competitiveness in the flat-panel digital television and display market, Toshiba has made a considerable investment in a new kind of display technology called SED. This technology, however, was never sold to the public, as it was not price-competitive with LCDs. Toshiba sold its share in SED Inc. to Canon after Nano-Proprietary, which owns several patents related to SED technology, claimed SED Inc. was not a subsidiary of Canon. Before World War II, Toshiba was a member of the Mitsui Group zaibatsu (family-controlled vertical monopoly). Today Toshiba is a member of the Mitsui keiretsu (a set of companies with interlocking business relationships and shareholdings), and still has preferential arrangements with Mitsui Bank and the other members of the keiretsu. Membership in a keiretsu has traditionally meant loyalty, both corporate and private, to other members of the keiretsu or allied keiretsu. This loyalty can extend as far as the beer the employees consume, which in Toshiba's case is Asahi.

In July 2005, BNFL confirmed it planned to sell Westinghouse Electric Company, then estimated to be worth $1.8 billion (£1 billion). The bid attracted interest from several companies including Toshiba, General Electric and Mitsubishi Heavy Industries and when the Financial Times reported on 23 January 2006 that Toshiba had won the bid, it valued the company's offer at $5 billion (£2.8 billion). The sale of Westinghouse by the Government of the United Kingdom surprised many industry experts, who questioned the wisdom of selling one of the world's largest producers of nuclear reactors shortly before the market for nuclear power was expected to grow substantially; China, the United States and the United Kingdom were all expected to invest heavily in nuclear power. The acquisition of Westinghouse for $5.4 billion was completed on 17 October 2006, with Toshiba obtaining a 77 percent share, and partners The Shaw Group a 20 percent share and Ishikawajima-Harima Heavy Industries Co. Ltd. a 3 percent share.

In late 2007, Toshiba took over from Discover Card as the sponsor of the top-most screen of One Times Square in New York City. It displays the iconic 60-second New Year's countdown on its screen, as well as messages, greetings, and advertisements for the company. The sponsor of the New Year's countdown was taken over by Capital One on 31 December 2018.

In January 2009, Toshiba acquired the HDD business of Fujitsu.

2010 to 2014
Toshiba announced on 16 May 2011, that it had agreed to acquire all of the shares of the Swiss-based advanced-power-meter maker Landis+Gyr for $2.3 billion. In 2010 the company released a series of television models including the WL768, YL863, VL963 designed in collaboration with Danish designer Timothy Jacob Jensen.
In April 2012, Toshiba agreed to acquire IBM's point-of-sale business for $850 million, making it the world's largest vendor of point-of-sale systems.

In July 2012, Toshiba was accused of fixing the prices of LCD panels in the United States at a high level. While such claims were denied by Toshiba, they agreed to settle alongside several other manufacturers for a total of $571 million.

In December 2013, Toshiba completed its acquisition of Vijai Electricals Limited plant at Hyderabad and set up its own base for manufacturing of transmission and distribution products (transformers and switchgears) under the Social Infrastructure Group in India as Toshiba Transmission & Distribution Systems (India) Private Limited.
In January 2014, Toshiba completed its acquisition of OCZ Storage Solutions. OCZ Technology stock was halted on 27 November 2013. OCZ then stated they expected to file a petition for bankruptcy and that Toshiba Corporation had expressed interest in purchasing its assets in a bankruptcy proceeding. On 2 December 2013, OCZ announced Toshiba had agreed to purchase nearly all of OCZ's assets for $35 million. The deal was completed on 21 January 2014 when the assets of OCZ Technology Group became a new independently operated subsidiary of Toshiba named OCZ Storage Solutions. OCZ Technology Group then changed its name to ZCO Liquidating Corporation; on 18 August 2014, ZCO Liquidating Corporation and its subsidiaries were liquidated. OCZ Storage Solutions was dissolved on 1 April 2016 and absorbed into Toshiba America Electronic Components, Inc., with OCZ becoming a brand of Toshiba.

In March 2014, Toshiba sued SK Hynix, accusing the company of stealing technology of its NAND flash memory. In the late same year, the two companies settled with a deal in which SK Hynix pays US$278 million to Toshiba. Toshiba had sued Hynix in the early 2000s for patent infringement.

In October 2014, Toshiba and United Technologies agreed a deal to expand their joint venture outside Japan.

2015 accounting scandal
Toshiba first announced in May 2015 that it was investigating an accounting scandal and it might have to revise its profits for the previous three years. On 21 July 2015, CEO Hisao Tanaka announced his resignation amid an accounting scandal that he called "the most damaging event for our brand in the company's 140-year history". Profits had been inflated by $1.2 billion over the previous seven years. Eight other senior officials also resigned, including the two previous CEOs. Chairman Masashi Muromachi was appointed acting CEO. Following the scandal, Toshiba Corp. was removed from a stock index showcasing Japan's best companies. That was the second reshuffle of the index, which picks companies with the best operating income, return on equity and market value.

Toshiba announced in early 2015 that they would stop making televisions in its own factories. From 2015 onward, Toshiba televisions will be made by Compal for the U.S., or by Vestel and other manufacturers for the European market.

In September 2015, Toshiba shares fell to their lowest point in two and a half years. The firm said in a statement that its net losses for the quarterly period were 12.3 billion yen ($102m; £66m). The company noted poor performances in its televisions, home appliances and personal computer businesses.

In October 2015, Toshiba sold the image sensor business to Sony.

In December 2015, Muromachi said the episode had wiped about $8 billion off Toshiba's market value. He forecast a record 550 billion yen (about US$4.6 billion) annual loss and warned the company would have to overhaul its TV and computer businesses. Toshiba would not be raising funds for two years, he said. The next week, a company spokesperson announced Toshiba would seek 300 billion yen ($2.5 billion) in 2016, taking the company's indebtedness to more than 1 trillion yen (about $8.3 billion).

In January 2016, Toshiba's security division unveiled a new bundle of services for schools that use its surveillance equipment. The program, which is intended for both K-12 and higher education, includes education discounts, alerts, and post-warranty support, among other features, on its IP-based security gear.

In March 2016, Toshiba was preparing to start construction on a cutting-edge new semiconductor plant in Japan that would mass-produce chips based on the ultra-dense flash variant. Toshiba expected to spend approximately 360 billion yen, or $3.2 billion, on the project through May 2019.

In April 2016, Toshiba recalled 100,000 faulty laptop lithium-ion batteries, which were made by Panasonic, that can overheat, posing burn and fire hazards to consumers, according to the U.S. Consumer Product Safety Commission. Toshiba first announced the recall in January and said it was recalling the batteries in certain Toshiba Notebook computers sold since June 2011.

In May 2016, it was announced that Satoshi Tsunakawa, the former head of Toshiba's medical equipment division, was named CEO. This appointment came after the accounting scandal that occurred.

In September 2016, Toshiba announced the first wireless power receiver IC using the Qi 1.2.2 specification, developed in association with the Wireless Power Consortium.

In December 2016, Toshiba Medical Systems Corporation was acquired by Canon.

A Chinese electrical appliance corporation Midea Group bought a controlling 80.1% stake in the Toshiba Home Appliances Group.

2017 US nuclear construction liabilities
In late December 2016, the management of Toshiba requested an "urgent press briefing" to announce that the newly-found losses in the Westinghouse subsidiary from Vogtle Electric Generating Plant nuclear plant construction would lead to a write-down of several billion dollars, bankrupting Westinghouse and threatening to bankrupt Toshiba. The exact amount of the liabilities was unavailable.

In January 2017, a person with direct knowledge of the matter reported that the company plans on making its memory chip division a separate business, to save Toshiba from bankruptcy.

In February 2017, Toshiba revealed unaudited details of a 390 billion yen ($3.4 billion) corporate wide loss, mainly arising from its majority owned US based Westinghouse nuclear construction subsidiary which was written down by 712 billion yen ($6.3 billion). On 14 February 2017, Toshiba delayed filing financial results, and chairman Shigenori Shiga, formerly chairman of Westinghouse, resigned.

Construction delays, regulatory changes and cost overruns at Westinghouse-built nuclear facilities Vogtle units 3 and 4 in Waynesboro, Georgia and VC Summer units 2 and 3 in South Carolina, were cited as the main causes of the dramatic fall in Toshiba's financial performance and collapse in the share price. Fixed priced construction contracts negotiated by Westinghouse with Georgia Power left Toshiba with uncharted liabilities that resulted in the sale of key Toshiba operating subsidiaries to secure the company's future.

Westinghouse filed for Chapter 11 bankruptcy protection on 29 March 2017. Toshiba was estimated to have 9 billion dollar annual net loss.

On 11 April 2017, Toshiba filed unaudited quarterly results. Auditors PricewaterhouseCoopers had not signed of the accounts because of uncertainties at Westinghouse. Toshiba stated that "substantial doubt about the company's ability to continue as a going concern exists". On 25 April 2017, Toshiba announced its decision to replace its auditor after less than a year. Earlier in April, the company filed twice-delayed business results without an endorsement from auditor PricewaterhouseCoopers (PwC).

On 20 September 2017, Toshiba's board approved a deal to sell its memory chip business to a group led by Bain Capital for US$18 billion, with financial backing by companies such as Apple, Dell Technologies, Hoya Corporation, Kingston Technology, Seagate Technology, and SK Hynix. The newly independent company was named Toshiba Memory Corporation, and then renamed Kioxia.

On 15 November 2017, Hisense reached a deal to acquire 95% of Toshiba Visual Solutions (televisions) for US$113.6 million.

Later that month, the company announced that it would pull out of its long-standing sponsorships of the Japanese television programs Sazae-san, Nichiyō Gekijo, and the video screens topping out One Times Square in New York City. The company cited that the value of these placements were reduced by its exit from consumer-oriented lines of business.

On 6 April 2018, Toshiba announced the completion of the sale of Westinghouse's holding company to Brookfield Business Partners and some partners for $4.6 billion.

Present and future

In June 2018, Toshiba sold 80.1% of its Client Solutions (personal computers) business unit to Sharp for $36m, with an option allowing Sharp to buy the remaining 19.9% share. Sharp renamed the business to Dynabook, a brand name Toshiba had used in Japan, and started releasing products under that name. On  June 30, 2020, Sharp exercised its option to acquire the remaining 19.9% percent of Dynabook shares from Toshiba.

In May 2019, Toshiba announced that it would put non-Japanese investors on its board for the first time in nearly 80 years. In November, the company transferred its logistics service business to SBS Group.

In January 2020, Toshiba unveiled its plan to launch quantum cryptography services by September the same year. It also announced a number of other technologies waiting for commercialization, including an affordable solid-state Lidar based on silicon photomultiplier, high-capacity hydrogen fuel cells, and a proprietary computer algorithm named Simulated Bifurcation Algorithm that mimics quantum computing, of which it plans to sell access to other parties such as financial institutions, social networking services, etc. The company claims the algorithm running on a desktop PC at room temperature environment is capable of surpassing the performance of similar algorithms running on existing supercomputers, even that of laser-based quantum computer when a specialized setting is given. It has been added to quantum computing services offered by major cloud platforms including Microsoft Azure.

In October 2020, Toshiba made a decision to pull out of the system LSI business citing mounted losses while reportedly mulling on the sale of its semiconductor fabs as well. In April 2021, CVC Capital Partners made a takeover offer.

On  November 12, 2021, Toshiba announced that it would split into three separate companies. Two of the companies will respectively focus on infrastructure and electronic devices; the third, which will retain the Toshiba name, would manage the 40.6% stake in Kioxia and all other remaining assets. The company expects to complete the plan by March 2024. Toshiba announced in February 2022 that it plans to split into two companies instead after the original proposal proved unpopular with shareholders.

Operations

As of 2012, Toshiba had 39 R&D facilities worldwide, which employed around 4,180 people, and was organized into four main business groupings: the Digital Products Group, the Electronic Devices Group, the Home Appliances Group and the Social Infrastructure Group. In the same year, 45 percent of Toshiba's sales were generated in Japan and 55 percent in the rest of the world.

Toshiba registered a total of 2,483 patents in the United States in 2011, the fifth-largest number of any company (after IBM, Samsung Electronics, Canon and Panasonic).

Toshiba had around 141,256 employees as of 31 March 2018.

Products, services, and standards
Toshiba has had a range of products and services, including air conditioners, consumer electronics (including televisions and DVD and Blu-ray players), control systems (including air-traffic control systems, railway systems, security systems and traffic control systems), electronic point of sale equipment, elevators and escalators, home appliances (including refrigerators and washing machines), IT services, lighting, materials and electronic components, medical equipment (including CT and MRI scanners, ultrasound equipment and X-ray equipment), office equipment, business telecommunication equipment personal computers, semiconductors, power systems (including electricity turbines, fuel cells and nuclear reactors) power transmission and distribution systems, and TFT displays.

HD DVD

Toshiba had played a critical role in the development and proliferation of DVD. On 19 February 2008, Toshiba announced that it would be discontinuing its HD DVD storage format, the successor of DVD, following defeat in a format war against Blu-ray. The HD DVD format had failed after most of the major US film studios backed the Blu-ray format, which was developed by Sony, Panasonic, Philips and Pioneer Corporation. Conceding the abandonment of HD DVD, Toshiba's president, Atsutoshi Nishida said "We concluded that a swift decision would be best [and] if we had continued, that would have created problems for consumers, and we simply had no chance to win".

Toshiba continued to supply retailers with machines until the end of March 2008, and continued to provide technical support to the estimated one million people worldwide who owned HD DVD players and recorders. Toshiba announced a new line of stand-alone Blu-ray players as well as drives for PCs and laptops, and subsequently joined the BDA, the industry body which oversees the development of the Blu-ray format.

REGZA

REGZA (Real Expression Guaranteed by Amazing Architecture) is a unified television brand owned and manufactured by Toshiba. In 2010 REGZA name disappeared from the North American market, and from March 2015 new TVs carrying the Toshiba name are designed and produced by Compal Electronics, a Taiwanese company, to which Toshiba has licensed its name. REGZA is also used in Android-based smartphones that were developed by Fujitsu Toshiba Mobile Communications.

3D television
In October 2010, Toshiba unveiled the Toshiba Regza GL1 21" LED-backlit LCD TV glasses-free 3D prototype at CEATEC 2010. This system supports 3D capability without glasses (utilizing an integral imaging system of 9 parallax images with a vertical lenticular sheet). The retail product was released in December 2010.

4K Ultra HD televisions
4K Ultra HD (3840×2160p) televisions provides four times the resolution of 1080p Full HD televisions. Toshiba's 4K HD LED televisions are powered by a CEVO 4K Quad + dual-core processor.

Laptops

In 1985, Toshiba released the T1100, the world's first commercially accepted laptop PC.

In October 2014, Toshiba released the Chromebook 2, a new version with a thinner profile and a much-improved display. The Chromebook runs exclusively on ChromeOS and gives users free Google Drive storage and access to a collection of apps and extensions at the Chrome Web Store. Toshiba initialized process of divestment of the personal computer and laptop business, Toshiba Client Solutions, in 2018 with sale of 80.1% of shares to Sharp Corporation. Eventually Toshiba fully exited from the personal computing market in June 2020, transferring the remaining 19.9% shares in Toshiba Client Solutions (since being renamed to Dynabook Inc.) to Sharp. Divested personal computing business of Toshiba has adopted Dynabook name after one of its product lines and a concept of a computer for children.

Flash memory
In the 1980s, a Toshiba team led by Fujio Masuoka invented flash memory, both NOR and NAND types. In March 2015, Toshiba announced the development of the first 48-layer, three-dimensional flash memory. The new flash memory is based on a vertical stacking technology that Toshiba calls BiCS (Bit Cost Scaling), stores two bits of data per transistor, and can store 128Gbits (16GB) per chip. This allowed flash memory to keep scaling up the capacity as Moore's Law was considered to be obsolete. Toshiba's memory division was spun off as Toshiba Memory Corporation, now Kioxia.

Environmental record
Toshiba has been judged as making "low" efforts to lessen its impact on the environment. In November 2012, they came second from the bottom in Greenpeace's 18th edition of the Guide to Greener Electronics that ranks electronics companies according to their policies on products, energy, and sustainable operations. Toshiba received 2.3 of a possible 10 points, with the top company (WIPRO) receiving 7.1 points. "Zero" scores were received in the categories "Clean energy policy advocacy", "Use of recycled plastics in products" and "Policy and practice on sustainable sourcing of fibres for paper".

In 2010, Toshiba reported that all of its new LCD TVs comply with the Energy Star standards and 34 models exceed the requirements by 30% or more.

Toshiba also partnered with China's Tsinghua University in 2008 in order to form a research facility to focus on energy conservation and the environment. The new Toshiba Energy and Environment Research Center is located in Beijing where forty students from the university will work to research electric power equipment and new technologies that will help stop the global warming process. Through this partnership, Toshiba hopes to develop products that will better protect the environment and save China. This contract between Tsinghua University and Toshiba originally began in October 2007 when they signed an agreement on joint energy and environment research. The projects that they conduct work to reduce car pollution and to create power systems that don't negatively affect the environment.

On 28 December 1970 Toshiba began the construction of unit 3 of the Fukushima Daiichi Nuclear Power Plant which was damaged in the Fukushima I nuclear accidents on 14 March 2011. In April 2011, CEO Norio Sasaki declared nuclear energy would "remain as a strong option" even after the Fukushima I nuclear accidents.

In late 2013, Toshiba (Japan) entered the solar power business in Germany, installing PV systems on apartment buildings.

See also
 List of Toshiba subsidiaries

References

External links

Business data for Tōshiba (TYO:6502) at Tokyo Stock Exchange, Inc. 
Business data for Tōshiba (NAG:6502) at Nagoya Stock Exchange, Inc.

 
 
Japanese companies established in 1875
Conglomerate companies based in Tokyo
Accounting scandals
Electronics companies established in 1875
Companies listed on the Nagoya Stock Exchange
Companies listed on the Osaka Exchange
Companies listed on the Tokyo Stock Exchange
Computer hardware companies
Computer memory companies
Computer storage companies
Consumer battery manufacturers
Consumer electronics brands
Defense companies of Japan
Display technology companies
Electric transformer manufacturers
Electrical engineering companies of Japan
Elevator manufacturers
Escalator manufacturers
Home appliance manufacturers of Japan
Heating, ventilation, and air conditioning companies
Japanese brands
Lighting brands
Locomotive manufacturers of Japan
Technology companies established in 1875
Medical technology companies of Japan
Mitsui
Multinational companies headquartered in Japan
Netbook manufacturers
Nuclear technology companies of Japan
Point of sale companies
Robotics companies of Japan
Scandals in Japan
Semiconductor companies of Japan
Video equipment manufacturers
State-owned film companies
Electric motor manufacturers
Engine manufacturers of Japan
Radio manufacturers
1940s initial public offerings
Electronics companies of Japan